Mohd. Salim bin Mohd. Sharif (Jawi: محمد سليم بن محمد شريف, born 1 January 1966) is a Malaysian politician who has served as Chairman of Rubber Industry Smallholders Development Authority (RISDA) since May 2020. He served as Senator from April 2014 to April 2017 and Member of Parliament (MP) for Jempol from May 2018 to November 2022 and is a member of the United Malays National Organisation (UMNO), a component party of the ruling Barisan Nasional (BN) coalition. In addition, he has also served as UMNO Jempol divisional chief since 2013.

Politics

1. Malaysian Senator (representing Negeri Sembilan) — (2014–2017)

2. UMNO Jempol division chief
— (2013–current)

3. MP for Jempol — (2018–2022)

Election results

Honours 
  :
  Grand Commander of the Order of the Territorial Crown (SMW) – Datuk Seri (2022)
  :
  Knight of the Order of Loyal Service to Negeri Sembilan (DBNS) - Dato' (2012)

References 

Living people
People from Negeri Sembilan
Malaysian people of Malay descent
Malaysian Muslims
United Malays National Organisation politicians
Members of the Dewan Rakyat
21st-century Malaysian politicians
1966 births